Grabowa  is a village in the administrative district of Gmina Łubnice, within Staszów County, Świętokrzyskie Voivodeship, in south-central Poland.

The village has a population of  67.

Demography 
According to the 2002 Poland census, there were 75 people residing in Grabowa village, of whom 48% were male and 52% were female. In the village, the population was spread out, with 20% under the age of 18, 33.3% from 18 to 44, 14.7% from 45 to 64, and 32% who were 65 years of age or older.
 Figure 1. Population pyramid of village in 2002 – by age group and sex

References

Villages in Staszów County